Owen Thomas Jones, FRS FGS (16 April 1878 – 5 May 1967) was a Welsh geologist.

Education
He was born in Beulah, near Newcastle Emlyn, Cardiganshire, the only son of David Jones and Margaret Thomas. He attended the local village school in Trewen before going to Pencader Grammar School in 1893. In 1896 he went up to University College, Aberystwyth, to study physics, graduating in 1900. He then went to Trinity College, Cambridge, and was awarded a B.A. degree in Natural Sciences (geology) in 1902.

Career
In 1903 he joined the British Geological Survey, working near his home in Carmarthenshire and Pembrokeshire. In 1910 he was appointed the first professor of geology in Aberystwyth. In 1913 he became professor of geology at the University of Manchester, and then, in 1930, Woodwardian Professor of Geology at the University of Cambridge (until 1943). He dedicated his working life to the study of Welsh geology.

Awards and honours
In 1926 he was elected a Fellow of the Royal Society. In 1956 he was awarded the Royal Medal of the Royal Society, and on receiving it he was described as 'the most versatile of living British geologists'. The same year he was awarded the Wollaston Medal and the Lyell Medal of the Geological Society of London. He was twice president of the Geological Society.

He died at the age of 89 having produced more than 140 publications. A year before his death he published a paper describing the Welsh source of the bluestones of Stonehenge (written in Welsh).

References

1878 births
1967 deaths
Welsh geologists
Woodwardian Professors of Geology
Wollaston Medal winners
Lyell Medal winners
Royal Medal winners
Fellows of the Royal Society
People from Ceredigion
Alumni of Trinity College, Cambridge
Academics of the Victoria University of Manchester